Page 3 culture is the name given to tabloid culture in India covering India's partying, high society or upper class, and metropolitan culture, specifically Mumbai's, Delhi's and Bangalore's, which are all a feature of page three tabloid newspapers.

Description
The term originates from India's colourful daily newspaper supplements appearing usually on the third page that document parties. Page 3 features colour photo spreads of celebrities and the nouveau riche at parties. Those featured on page 3 often include fashion designers, socialites, models, remix music divas and the glamorous and rich.

Page 3 has become a phenomenon which arose from sensationalism.

In popular culture
The "Page 3" culture has been the theme of a Hindi film by Madhur Bhandarkar, Page 3 (2005), which won the National Film Award for Best Feature Film amongst other awards.

References

External links
 
 
 thehindubusinessline.com 

Culture of Mumbai
Indian slang
Sociological terminology
Popular culture language
Indian English idioms
Journalism